In linguistic typology, an analytic language is a language that conveys relationships between words in sentences primarily by way of helper words (particles, prepositions, etc.) and word order, as opposed to using inflections (changing the form of a word to convey its role in the sentence). For example, the English-language phrase "The cat chases the ball" conveys the fact that the cat is acting on the ball analytically via word order. This can be contrasted to synthetic languages, which rely heavily on inflections to convey word relationships (e.g., the phrases "The cat chases the ball" and "The cat chased the ball" convey different time frames via changing the form of the word chase). Most languages are not purely analytic, but many rely primarily on analytic syntax.

Typically, analytic languages have a low morpheme-per-word ratio, especially with respect to inflectional morphemes. A grammatical construction can similarly be analytic if it uses unbound morphemes, which are separate words, or word order. Analytic languages rely more heavily on the use of definite and indefinite articles (which tend to be less prominently used or absent in strongly synthetic languages), stricter word order, various prepositions, postpositions, particles, modifiers, and context.

Background
The term analytic is commonly used in a relative rather than an absolute sense. The currently most prominent and widely used Indo-European analytic language is modern English, which has lost much of the inflectional morphology inherited from Proto-Indo-European, Proto-Germanic, and Old English over the centuries and has not gained any new inflectional morphemes in the meantime, making it more analytic than most other Indo-European languages.

For example, though Proto-Indo-European had much more complex grammatical conjugation, grammatical genders, dual number and inflections for eight or nine cases in its nouns, pronouns, adjectives, numerals, participles, postpositions and determiners, standard English has lost nearly all of them (except for three modified cases for pronouns) along with genders and dual number and simplified its conjugation.

Latin, Spanish, German, Greek and Russian are synthetic languages. Nouns in Russian inflect for at least six cases, most of which descended from Proto-Indo-European cases, whose functions English translates using other strategies like prepositions, verbal voice, word order, and possessive  instead.

Modern Hebrew is much more analytic than Classical Hebrew, both with nouns and with verbs.

Isolating language
A related concept is the isolating language, which is about a low number of any type of morphemes per word, taking into account derivational morphemes as well. A purely isolating language would be analytic by necessity and lack inflectional morphemes by definition. However, the reverse is not necessarily true, and a language can have derivational morphemes but lack inflectional morphemes.  For example, Mandarin Chinese has many compound words, giving it a moderately high ratio of morphemes per word, but since it has almost no inflectional affixes at all to convey grammatical relationships, it is a very analytic language.

English is not totally analytic in its nouns since it does use inflections for number (e.g., "one day, three days; one boy, four boys") and possession ("The boy's ball" vs. "The boy has a ball").  Mandarin Chinese, in contrast, has no inflections on its nouns: compare   'one day',   'three days' (literally 'three day');   'one boy' (lit. 'one [entity of] male child'),   'four boys' (lit. 'four [entity of] male child'). Instead, English is considered to be weakly inflected, and comparatively more analytic than most other Indo-European languages.

Persian could be considered an analytic language. Generally, there are no inflections as we know it. There is a system of prefixes and suffixes which are used to connect the words to express possession or attribute a quality. They could be integrated in the word in writing while keeping their function. For example, the suffix   makes the words plural like does 's' in English. Therefore,   'The girls came'. 
In Persian, the is no agreement of subject's (or adjective's) number (or gender in many other languages because of being inherently a Genderless language)). Practically, there are no inflections for numbers keeping the above example;   'one day',   'three days' (literally 'three day'),  'one boy' (lit. 'One boy'),   'four boys' (lit. 'Four boy'). Similarly, there are no inflections for possession as well. A short '-e' sound (a diacritical mark)   added after a word starting with a consonants letter, shows that it is possessed by (or belongs to) the next word so 'The boy's ball' would be  . However, this diacritical mark 'ـِ' is put under the last letter of the first word for beginners and in written literatures and everyday publications it is usually omitted but is pronounced when reading. However, in literature and daily writings it is omitted but pronounced in reading. The same system is used for connection of adjectives and attributes to words.

List of analytic languages 

 Indo-European languages
 Germanic languages
 Afrikaans
 Danish
 English (mostly analytic)
 Swedish
 Others
 Bulgarian and Macedonian, forming the Eastern South Slavic language sub-group, the only (partially) analytic Slavic languages
 French (partially)
 Kalto
 Austronesian languages
 Hawaiian
 Maori
 Sino-Tibetan languages
 Burmese
 Sinitic languages (including Mandarin and Cantonese)
 Austroasiatic languages
 Vietnamese 
 Khmer
 Kra-Dai languages
 Thai
 Lao 
 Hmong-Mien languages
 Hmong
 Maybrat
 Mixtec
 Sango
 Yoruba

See also
Auxiliary verb
Free morpheme
Isolating language
Zero-marking language
Synthetic language
Linguistic typology

References

Linguistic typology